Valère Ollivier (21 September 1921 – 10 February 1958) was a Belgian racing cyclist. He won the Belgian national road race title in 1949, Gent–Wevelgem in 1948, and Kuurne–Brussels–Kuurne in 1945 and in 1950.

References

External links

1921 births
1958 deaths
Belgian male cyclists
People from Roeselare
Sportspeople from West Flanders
20th-century Belgian people